Dysprosium titanate (Dy2Ti2O7) is an inorganic compound, a ceramic of the titanate family, with pyrochlore structure. 

Dysprosium titanate, like holmium titanate and holmium stannate, is a spin ice material. In 2009, quasiparticles resembling magnetic monopoles were observed at low temperature and high magnetic field.

Dysprosium titanate (Dy2TiO5) is used since 1995 as material for control rods of commercial nuclear reactor.

References 

Dysprosium compounds
Titanates
Ceramic materials
Neutron poisons